Inspector Pink Dragon is a 1991 Hong Kong action comedy film directed by Gordon Chan, written by John Chan, and starring Lawrence Cheng, who produced with Chua Lam. The film is also one of the earliest Hong Kong productions shot in sync sound.

Plot
Inspector Ma Yue-lung (Lawrence Cheng) bumps into his ex-classmate and longtime lover, Julia (Rosamund Kwan), while catching a thief. They both later go to an alumni reunion and see another ex-classmate, Ma Yau-yau (Tony Leung Ka-fai), who is now Julia's superior. When Yau returns home, he is murdered by Peter (Peter Lai). Heavy Crime Bureau chief Pau Yu Chat (Kenneth Tsang) sends Lung to go undercover to take Yau's job. After Lung goes undercover, he rises in rank and his paychecks increase. Julia also begins to develop feelings for Lung. Lung's girlfriend, Ching (Nina Li Chi), suspects that something is wrong with Lung. Later, Julia brings Lung to meet a land developer, Tang Kwok-kiu (Damian Lau). During that time, another murder case comes up. Lung later finds out that Tang is the mastermind behind this, but he, Julia and Ching has become Tang's chests. Another inspector, Shek Chun (Waise Lee), then gathers evidence and is determined to bring Tang to justice.

Cast

See also
 Hong Kong films of 1991

Notes
 The Chinese name of Lawrence Cheng's character (馬如龍) is the same name of Jackie Chan's character in Project A. Chan's character also has an English name, Dragon Ma, while Cheng's does not.
 The Chinese name of Tony Leung Ka-fai's character (馬友友) is also the Chinese name of famed celloist Yo-Yo Ma.

Box office
The film grossed HK$8,179,321 at the Hong Kong box office.

External links
 
 Inspector Pink Dragon at Hong Kong Cinemagic
 

1991 films
1991 action comedy films
1990s crime action films
1990s crime comedy films
1990s police comedy films
1990s police procedural films
1990s Cantonese-language films
Films directed by Gordon Chan
Films shot in Hong Kong
Golden Harvest films
Hong Kong action comedy films
Hong Kong crime action films
Hong Kong crime comedy films
Hong Kong police films
Police detective films
1990s Hong Kong films